Al Wakrah Basketball Team is a Qatari professional basketball team based in the city of Al Wakrah, in southern Qatar. Al Wakrah's basketball team currently competes in the top tier of basketball, the Qatari Basketball League. It is part of the Al-Wakrah Sport Club multisport club.

Honours

Domestic
Emir of Qatar Cup

 Runners-up (1): 2000–2001

Roster

Last Update: November 30, 2020

Notable players
To appear in this section a player must have either:
- Set a club record or won an individual award as a professional player.
- Played at least one official international match for his senior national team 
 Earnest Ross
 Kenny Gasana
 Jimmy Williams

Managerial history 
 Ihab Jalal (2003–)

See also
Al-Wakrah Sport Club
Qatari Basketball League

References

External links
Official website 
Asia-basket.com - Team Profile 

Basketball teams established in 1959
Basketball teams in Qatar